Podomachla insularis is a moth of the family Erebidae first described by George Talbot in 1929. It is found on São Tomé Island.

References

Nyctemerina
Moths of São Tomé and Príncipe
Fauna of São Tomé Island
Moths described in 1929
Taxa named by George Talbot (entomologist)